Ferdinando Carlo Gonzaga (31 August 1652 – 5 July 1708) was the only child of Duke Charles II of Mantua and Montferrat, and the last ruler of the Duchy of Mantua of the House of Gonzaga.

Biography
Born in Revere, In 1665 Ferdinand Charles received the imperial investiture on the Duchy of Mantua with the ceremony of Coronation at the Cathedral of St. Peter. The first act of the government of the Duke was to try to curb the abuses that occurred in the collection of court fees. At the same time, is implemented the reform of public order of the Duchy. Ferdinando Carlo, although he was a very intelligent man and attentive to the world of music (a great lover of music, in 1700 the composer Tomaso Albinoni he dedicated his second opera in press), however, proved more inclined to women and to do charitable works, rather than to hold the duchies of Mantua and Monferrato.

Ferdinand Charles first married Anna Isabella Gonzaga (d. 11 August 1703), daughter of Ferrante III Gonzaga, sovereign Duke of Guastalla. This marriage was arranged by the assistance of his aunt empress dowager Eleanor Gonzaga, and took place in 1671. Anna Isabella Gonzaga was the heir of the Duchy of Guastalla and Luzzara, and her rights transferred these areas, which had long been a source of conflict between the two Gonzaga lines, to the Mantua line of the Gonzaga dynasty. During the years of the government of the Duke Ferdinando Carlo, the duchy of Mantua had a period of development and autonomy in respect of the Empire. This aroused the suspicions of the Spain which, fearing the strengthening of the small state of Mantua, decided to suspend payment of the annual contribution of 50,000 crowns a garrison of Casale, thus provoking the wrath of the Duke of Mantua.

Frustrated by the Austrians in the conquest of Guastalla, he concluded a pact with Louis XIV of France on 8 December 1678, selling Casale. In this context his minister, Count Ercole Antonio Mattioli, might have become the Man in the Iron Mask, being imprisoned in Pinerolo since April 1679 for disclosing this pact to the enemies of France.

The duke denied everything, but concluded a new pact with the French in 1681, obtaining thereby a yearly pension of sixty thousand lire, a career as an army general, and a part in any future French conquests in Italy. The French occupied Casale on 29 September 1681 and the Duke of Mantua lost respect in Italy.

Although the Lorraine-Elbeufs were reckoned among the princes étrangers at the court of France, as a cadet branch (Elbeuf) of a non-reigning cadet branch (Guise) of the House of Lorraine, it was not their custom to marry crowned heads. Nevertheless, following the death of his first wife, Ferdinando sought Suzanne Henriette de Lorraine's hand in pursuit of an heir and a dynastic alliance with another reigning ducal house under French influence. She was the daughter of Charles de Lorraine, Duke d'Elbeuf by his third wife, Françoise de Montault de Navailles, daughter of Philippe de Montault, Duke de Navailles. Duke Ferdinando Carlo married Mademoiselle d'Elbeuf in Milan on 8 November 1704. To the French, her husband was known as Charles de Gonzague. This marriage was childless.

Ferdinando Carlo again chose the French side in the War of the Spanish Succession. In 1701, when the anti-French coalition forces conquered Mantua, he fled to Casale, leaving his consort Anna Isabella Gonzaga behind as regent during his absence. He paid heavily for his choice, when the French were chased back over the Alps in 1706. after the death of Duchess of Mantua, Ferdinando Carlo Gonzaga his appointment Prime Minister Ascanio Andreasi thus constituting the 'last state board Ducale, with the task of keeping at bay the internal changes of the state Mantovano against war. Already declared a traitor in 1701 by Joseph I, Holy Roman Emperor, he was blamed with felony by the Diet of Regensburg, 30 June 1708, and all his possessions were confiscated.

The House of Savoy obtained the remaining half of Montferrat, having already conquered the first half in the War of the Mantuan Succession in 1631. The Duchy of Mantua became Austrian and ceased its independent existence. Ferdinando Carlo died the same year in Padua.

Ancestry

References and notes

Bibliography
 Alessandro Cont, Sotto tutela: il sovrano bambino in Italia (1659–1714), “Rivista storica italiana”, 124, 2 (agosto 2012), pp. 537–581,
 F. Amadei, Cronaca universale della città di Mantova. Volume IV, Mantova, 1954.

|-

|-

1652 births
1708 deaths
Dukes of Mantua
Dukes of Montferrat
Ferdinand Charles
F
17th-century Italian nobility
18th-century Italian people
Burials at the Palatine Basilica of Santa Barbara (Mantua)